This was Matt Bianco's first album after splitting from Warner Brothers. Eager to take on the world without the constraints of a marketing department, Mark Fisher and Mark Reilly recorded this in the Fishbowl, Fisher's own studio on the outskirts of London. This record saw a new group of session musicians participating in the production, although Robin Jones was still around to record percussive layers that support the songs' rhythm structure. Ronnie Ross had died, so the brass section had to be reorganised as well, giving the record a different timbre. To be sold, the record needed distributors, which were found for Germany, France, Spain, Latin America and Asia, but only JVC-Victor in Japan really made some headway in promoting them to the local audience, and the album went Gold there. Due to lack of airplay it failed to have any major impact in the rest of the world. This was not due to particularly bad material, as songs like "You and I" and "Head over Heels" are some of the best Fisher wrote. Nevertheless, the lack of backing of a major label was certainly showing.

Track listing
All songs written by Matt Bianco except as indicated.

"Our Love" (4:50)
"The World Is a Ghetto" (Papa Dee Allen, Harold Brown, B. B. Dickerson, Lonnie Jordan, Charles Miller, Lee Oskar, Howard E. Scott) (4:45)
"You and I" (4:14)
"Buddy Love" (4:37)
"Can You Feel It" (4:43)
"I Need You Now" (5:15)
"Head Over Heels" (4:15)
"Your Destiny" (4:35)
"Another Time Another Place" (6:30)

Notes

External links
 Matt Bianco's detailed discography

1994 albums
Matt Bianco albums